HMS Windsor Castle was a triple-decker, 102-gun first-rate Royal Navy ship of the line. She was renamed HMS Cambridge in 1869, when she replaced a ship of the same name as gunnery ship off Plymouth.

Life

Early life
She was intended to carry 110 guns, but work was suspended. She was reordered on 29 June 1848 to a modified design, and reordered again on 28 February 1857 when she was ordered to be converted from sail to mixed sail/steam propulsion whilst on the stocks and to be fitted with 120 guns. She was renamed Windsor Castle on 6 January 1855 and launched on 26 August 1858, having since been reduced to carry 116 guns, and then 102 guns. She cost a total of £117,030, £84,555 spent on her hull as a sailing vessel, her conversion had cost another £14,878. 204 feet long, and of 4971 tons displacement, she had a crew of 930, but almost immediately entered the first-class steam reserve - The Times reported on 13 September 1860 reported her as among the "ships and gunboats in the first-class steam reserve which could be got ready for the pennant at a short notice". By 1862 she had been reduced to 97 guns.

Gunnery school

She was renamed HMS Cambridge in 1869, when she replaced a ship of the same name as gunnery ship off Plymouth. On 8 December 1872, she was driven ashore in a storm. At that point, she was armed with 29 guns. She was refloated the next day. Cambridge was later joined by HMS Calcutta as her tender, with a wooden bridge between the bow of HMS Cambridge and the stern of the Calcutta.  Other of her tenders included HMS Gorgon, Plucky and Sabrina (around 1877) and HMS Bonetta, Bulldog, Cuckoo, Hecate, Plucky, Sabrina, Snap (around 1890), and Undaunted (from 1901).  In 1890, some of her officers were listed as bound for Foudroyant and Perseus.

In June 1902 she was at Devonport, when Rear-Admiral Assheton Curzon-Howe hoisted his flag on board as second in command of the Channel Squadron.

Fate
She was towed on 30 October 1907 to No. 5 Basin of the Royal Dockyard to enable the gunnery school to move ashore into the Naval Barracks, paid off on 4 November that year and sold to Cox on 24 June 1908 for breaking up at Falmouth.

Captains
 January 1869 - May 1871: Fitzgerald Algernon Charles Foley
February 1874: F. Herbert R.N.
 Around 12 August 1877: Thomas Le Hunte Ward
 15 August 1883 – 25 August 1886: George Stanley Bosanquet
 December 1896: William Metcalfe Lang
 August 1898 - 1900: Captain Robert William Craigie
 August 1900 - August 1903: Captain Charles Ramsay Arbuthnot

References

 
 Lyon, David and Winfield, Rif, The Sail and Steam Navy List, All the Ships of the Royal Navy 1815–1889, pub Chatham, 2004,

External links
 
 
http://www.pdavis.nl/ShowShip.php?id=1196
Royal Navy Gunnery School – The Encyclopaedia of Plymouth History

 

Ships of the line of the Royal Navy
History of Plymouth, Devon
1858 ships
Maritime incidents in December 1872